The World of Motorcycles Expo is an annual consumer motorcycle show.  Started in London in 2004, it is open to the public and features custom motorcycles, new models, accessories and businesses relating to the sport. It has expanded to two other Ontario cities: Kitchener and Hamilton. Each city has its own unique show featuring local-area vendors and motorcycle enthusiasts.

For its first two seasons, this family-oriented event was held at the London Convention Centre before moving to the larger Western Fair District Agriplex building.  In 2009 organizers added a women-only component to the show.  2011 saw the addition of a show in Kitchener, Ontario. The first show in Hamilton, Ontario, was held in January 2012.

References

Motorcycle shows